The  Philadelphia Eagles season was the franchise's 6th season in the National Football League (NFL). The team improved on their previous output of 2–8–1, winning five games. The team failed to qualify for the playoffs for the sixth consecutive season.

Off Season

NFL Draft 
The 1938 NFL Draft was held on December 12, 1937. The draft consisted of 12 rounds. The Eagles got the second pick in each round, as the expansion Cleveland Rams got the first pick. With the pick they chose Corbett Davis, a back from Indiana University.

Player selections 
The table shows the Eagles' selections, what picks they had that were traded away, and the team that ended up with that pick. It is possible the Eagles' pick ended up with this team via another team that the Eagles made a trade with.
Not shown are acquired picks that the Eagles traded away.

Regular season

Schedule 

Note: Intra-division opponents are in bold text.

Standings

Playoffs 
The Eagles had a 5–6–0 record and failed to make it to the 1938 NFL Championship Game. The game was on December 11, 1938, at Polo Grounds in New York City. The game attendance was 48,120, a record crowd for a title game.

The game matched the champions of the Eastern Division, New York Giants (8–2–1) against the Western Division champion Green Bay Packers (8–3–0). The Giants won 23–17.

Roster 
(All time List of Philadelphia Eagles players in franchise history)

As in the 1937 roster, this year's team is mostly rookies and players with one or two years' NFL experience.

Awards and honors 
 Dave Smukler finished 2nd in TD passes with 7.
 Joe Carter finished 2nd in receiving TDs with 7.
 Dave Smukler returned the only kickoff for a TD this year in the NFL.
 Jay Arnold was one of 10 players to return an interception for a TD.
 Joe Carter was named to Pro All-Star team.
 Bill Hewitt was named to Pro All-Star team as a starter.

References 
 

Philadelphia Eagles seasons
Philadelphia Eagles
Philadelphia Eag